Bartimaeus may refer to: 

 Bartimaeus, the name of a man who received Jesus' healing the blind near Jericho (Mark 10:46-52)
 The Bartimaeus Sequence, a series of fantasy novels by Jonathan Stroud